Pleurotomella dimeres is an extinct species of sea snail, a marine gastropod mollusk in the family Raphitomidae.

Description

Distribution
Fossils of this marine species were found in Eocene strata of Île-de-France, France.

References

 Cossmann, Maurice. Catalogue illustré des coquilles fossiles de l'eocène des environs de Paris... Vol. 4. 1889.

dimeres
Gastropods described in 1889